WKRP is a call sign that has been used by several broadcast stations. It was made famous in the American sitcoms WKRP in Cincinnati and The New WKRP in Cincinnati, which portray a fictional radio station with that call sign.

Radio stations
WKRP-LP, a low-power radio station (101.9 FM) licensed to serve Raleigh, North Carolina, United States
WJCP, a radio station (1460 AM) licensed to serve North Vernon, Indiana, United States, which held the call sign WKRP from 1989 to 1997
WDPC 1500, Atlanta, Georgia, which was WKRP from its initial sign-on in 1979 until becoming WDPC in 1989
KMRI, Salt Lake City, Utah, branded "W KRPN Salt Lake City" in the 1980s

Television stations
WBQC-LD, Cincinnati, Ohio, branded "WKRP-TV Cincinnati" since 2008
WLPX-TV, Charleston, West Virginia, designated WKRP-TV from 1988 to 1998
WKWT-LD, Key West, Florida, which held the call sign WKRP-LP from 2009 to 2011
WRTN-LP, Nashville, Tennessee, which held the call sign WKRP-LP in 2005 to 2009
WDDN-LD, Washington, D.C., known as WKRP-LP from 1998 to 2005